William M. Elliott ( – September 20, 1882) was an American politician and businessman from Maryland. He served as a member of the Maryland House of Delegates, representing Harford County in 1854.

Career
Elliott served as a member of the Maryland House of Delegates, representing Harford County in 1854. He was elected as county commissioner in 1871. He was a Democrat.

Elliott built a large canning factory in Charles County and ran the business with his son Howell. He also worked in the fishing industry on the Potomac River for 25 years.

Personal life
Elliott married and had four daughters and one son, Mrs. Jacob C. Hollis, Mrs. George F. Walker, Mrs. John Cooley, Missouri and Howell B. Elliott had a home in Havre de Grace.

Elliott died on September 20, 1882, at the age of 71, at his farm in Charles County. He was buried at Grove Cemetery in Aberdeen.

References

Year of birth uncertain
1810s births
1882 deaths
People from Havre de Grace, Maryland
People from Charles County, Maryland
Maryland Democrats
Members of the Maryland House of Delegates
19th-century American politicians